Actinella fausta is a species of land snail in the family Geomitridae. It is endemic to the main island of Madeira, part of Portugal. It is not common but it is widespread on the island, occurring in several coastal sites. It lives in coastal scrub habitat in gullies and valleys.

References

Molluscs of Madeira
Actinella
Taxa named by Richard Thomas Lowe
Gastropods described in 1831
Taxonomy articles created by Polbot